Kings Landing is a New Brunswick living history museum with original buildings from the period of 1820-1920. It was created around buildings that were saved and moved to make way for the headpond for the Mactaquac Dam.

Although Kings Landing is not and never was a real village, New Brunswick and the areas surrounding Prince William were primarily settled by Anglo-American Loyalists from the Thirteen Colonies, who were called the United Empire Loyalists in Canada; Scottish, Irish and English immigrants were early settlers as well. It is approximately 40 km west of Fredericton, New Brunswick in the community of Lower Prince William.

Kings Landing is a representation of rural New Brunswick during the 19th and early 20th century. It is not a replica of an actual village, but a collection of salvaged or recreated buildings from around the Mactaquac headpond and other locations around New Brunswick. With few exceptions, all the historical buildings on the site have been moved and remodelled to specific years in their history. The project was originally started in the late 1960s and continues to the present day, as new buildings are being added every few years.

Interpretation
While the collection and preservation of artifacts is a major part of daily business, Kings Landing is first and foremost a living museum. The principle is simple: "Tell them and they'll forget. Show them and they'll remember. Involve them and they'll understand". Costumed interpreters with extensive knowledge of their area - and often more than one area - bring the site to life for the visitors. Interpretation on site ranges from simple explanations of household objects to complete demonstrations of period activities.

Structures and exhibits

More than a dozen houses, most of which are original buildings, are gathered on site. In the houses, employees welcome visitors, go about daily chores, cook period meals and create period crafts, all while in costumes appropriate to the time period of their area.

There are also "trades" buildings: these are the shops and businesses that the local men would have owned and operated, many of which would have required a period of apprenticeship/training for those employed there. Examples would be the Print Shop, Sash and Door Factory, Gorham's Carpenter Shop, Dennin's Blacksmith Shop, etc.

Being a living museum, these buildings are kept in working order whenever possible and, in some case, artisans provide goods and services for other parts of the village and for sale in the shops. The complex has a number of barns, and appropriate livestock to go with them. This ranges from chickens and geese to large work horses and oxen. The animals are kept on site not only for show, but also for practical purposes. For example, the chickens give eggs, the cows produce milk, and the horses are used to pull wagons for the visitors from one end of the village to the other.

List of locations at Kings Landing

 Welcome Centre
 Children's Play Park
 Heritage Gallery 
 Summer Stage
 C.B. Ross Factory Gallery & Workshop 
 Gordon Gallery 
 The Hagerman House
 The Joslin Farm
 The Jones Farm 
 Sawmill 
 Gristmill 
 King's Head Inn Restaurant & Pub 
 The Lint House
 The Blacksmith
 Ox Barn 
 The Long House
 St. Mark's Church (Anglican) 
 Carpenter Shop 
 The Heustis House
 The Fisher House 
 The Donaldson House
 The Ingraham House
 The Morehouse Farm
 The Grant Store
 The Perley House
 Parish School
 The Peddler's Market (Gift Shop)
 The Killeen Cabin 
 Riverside Presbyterian Church 
 The Print Shop
 Axe and Plough Café

Special events
Every few weekends, there are what are known as Special Events. These are often recreations of specific events in New Brunswick's history. They normally correspond to a particular date, or time of the year. For example, around and on July the 1st, the Confederation Debate features Charles Fisher and William Needham as portrayed by actors.  Visitors get a taste of the controversy surrounding the formation of Canada. As with most of the activities on site, the visitors are encouraged to join in, asking questions, giving votes.

Workshops
Kings Landing hosts workshops that happen during open hours. The workshops include learning about many different 19th century tasks and crafts, including candle making, beekeeping, woodworking, and several others.

History
Research for the site was begun in 1967 with the creation of a Historical Resources Administration Branch by the provincial government, which created the Mactaquac Historical Program. The program created the idea to establish a site to preserve cultural aspects that would otherwise be lost, as a living museum. 

The site was opened unofficially to the public in 1971 and officially on 20 July 1974.

Elizabeth II and Prince Philip visited the site in 1976.

References

External links
King's Landing Historical Settlement

Buildings and structures in York County, New Brunswick
Living museums in Canada
Museums in New Brunswick
History museums in New Brunswick
Open-air museums in Canada
Tourist attractions in York County, New Brunswick
Crown corporations of New Brunswick
United Empire Loyalists
Houses in New Brunswick
Folk museums in Canada
Blacksmith shops